Wasps of the genus Sphex (commonly known as digger wasps) are cosmopolitan predators that sting and paralyze prey insects. Sphex is one of many genera in the old digger wasp family Sphecidae (sensu lato), though most apart from the Sphecinae have now been moved to the family Crabronidae. There are over 130 known Sphex species.

Behaviour
In preparation for egg laying, they construct a protected "nest" (some species dig nests in the ground, while others use pre-existing holes) and then stock it with captured insects. Typically, the prey are left alive, but paralyzed by wasp toxins. The wasps lay their eggs in the provisioned nest and the wasp larvae feed on the paralyzed insects as they develop.

The great golden digger wasp (Sphex ichneumoneus) is found in North America. The developing wasps spend the winter in their nest. When the new generation of adults emerge, they contain the genetically programmed behaviors required to carry out another season of nest building. During the summer, a female might build as many as six nests, each with several compartments for her eggs. The building and provisioning of the nests takes place in a stereotypical, step-by-step fashion.

Sphex has been shown, as in some Jean-Henri Fabre studies, not to count how many crickets it collects for its nest. Although the wasp instinctively searches for four crickets, it cannot take into account a lost cricket, whether the cricket has been lost to ants or flies or simply been misplaced. Sphex drags its cricket prey towards its burrow by the antennae; if the antennae of the cricket are cut off, the wasp would not think to continue to pull its prey by a leg.

The navigation abilities of Sphex were studied by the ethologist Niko Tinbergen. Richard Dawkins and Jane Brockmann later studied female rivalry over nesting holes in Sphex ichneumoneus.

Use in philosophy 
Some writers in the philosophy of mind, most notably Daniel Dennett, have cited Sphex'''s behavior for their arguments about human and animal free will.

Some Sphex wasps drop a paralyzed insect near the opening of the nest. Before taking provisions into the nest, the Sphex first inspects the nest, leaving the prey outside. During the inspection, an experimenter can move the prey a few inches away from the opening. When the Sphex emerges from the nest ready to drag in the prey, it finds the prey missing. The Sphex quickly locates the moved prey, but now its behavioral "program" has been reset. After dragging the prey back to the opening of the nest, once again the Sphex is compelled to inspect the nest, so the prey is again dropped and left outside during another stereotypical inspection of the nest. This iteration can be repeated several times without the Sphex changing its sequence; by some accounts, endlessly. Dennett's argument quotes an account of Sphex behavior from Dean Wooldridge's Machinery of the Brain (1963). Douglas Hofstadter and Daniel Dennett have used this mechanistic behavior as an example of how seemingly thoughtful behavior can actually be quite mindless, the opposite of free will (or, as Dennett described it, sphexishness).

Philosopher Fred Keijzer challenges this use of Sphex, citing experiments in which behavioral adaptations are observed after many iterations. Keijzer sees the persistence of the Sphex example in cognitive theory as an indication of its rhetorical usefulness, not its factual accuracy. Of course, the repeated inspection of a disturbed nest may very well be an adaptive behavior, thus diminishing the aptness of Hofstadter's metaphor. As he concludes, "There is no reason for humans to remain stuck in an endless behavioral loop when wasps don’t."

Species

The genus Sphex contains 132 extant species:Sphex abyssinicus (Arnold, 1928)Sphex afer Lepeletier de Saint Fargeau, 1845Sphex ahasverus Kohl, 1890Sphex alacer Kohl, 1895Sphex antennatus F. Smith, 1856Sphex argentatissimus Dörfel and Ohl, 2015Sphex argentatus Fabricius, 1787Sphex argentinus Taschenberg, 1869Sphex ashmeadi (Fernald, 1906)Sphex atropilosus Kohl, 1885Sphex basilicus (R. Turner, 1915)Sphex bilobatus Kohl, 1895Sphex bohemanni Dahlbom, 1845Sphex brachystomus Kohl, 1890Sphex brasilianus Saussure, 1867Sphex brevipetiolatus Dörfel and Ohl, 2015Sphex caelebs Dörfel and Ohl, 2015Sphex caeruleanus Drury, 1773Sphex caliginosus Erichson, 1849Sphex camposi Campos, 1922Sphex carbonicolor Van der Vecht, 1973Sphex castaneipes Dahlbom, 1843Sphex cognatus F. Smith, 1856Sphex confrater Kohl, 1890Sphex corporosus Dörfel and Ohl, 2015Sphex cristi Genaro in Genaro & Juarrero, 2000Sphex cubensis (Fernald, 1906)Sphex darwinensis R. Turner, 1912Sphex decipiens Kohl, 1895Sphex decoratus F. Smith, 1873Sphex deplanatus Kohl, 1895Sphex diabolicus F. Smith, 1858Sphex dorsalis Lepeletier de Saint Fargeau, 1845Sphex dorycus Guérin-Méneville, 1838Sphex ephippium F. Smith, 1856Sphex ermineus Kohl, 1890Sphex erythrinus (Guiglia, 1939)Sphex ferrugineipes W. Fox, 1897Sphex finschii Kohl, 1890Sphex flammeus Dörfel and Ohl, 2015Sphex flavipennis Fabricius, 1793Sphex flavovestitus F. Smith, 1856Sphex formosellus Van der Vecht, 1957Sphex fortunatus Dörfel and Ohl, 2015Sphex fumicatus Christ, 1791Sphex fumipennis F. Smith, 1856Sphex funerarius Gussakovskij, 1934 – Golden Digger WaspSphex gaullei Berland, 1927Sphex gilberti R. Turner, 1908Sphex gracilis Dörfel and Ohl, 2015Sphex gisteli Strand, 1916Sphex guatemalensis Cameron, 1888Sphex habenus Say, 1832Sphex haemorrhoidalis Fabricius, 1781Sphex ichneumoneus (Linnaeus, 1758) – great golden digger waspSphex imporcatus Dörfel and Ohl, 2015Sphex incomptus Gerstaecker, 1871Sphex ingens F. Smith, 1856Sphex inusitatus Yasumatsu, 1935Sphex jamaicensis (Drury, 1773)Sphex jansei Cameron, 1910Sphex jucundus Dörfel and Ohl, 2015Sphex kolthoffi Gussakovskij, 1938Sphex lanatus Mocsáry, 1883Sphex latilobus Dörfel and Ohl, 2015Sphex latreillei Lepeletier de Saint Fargeau, 1831Sphex latro Erichson, 1849Sphex leuconotus Brullé, 1833Sphex libycus Beaumont, 1956Sphex lucae Saussure, 1867Sphex luctuosus F. Smith, 1856Sphex madasummae Van der Vecht, 1973Sphex malagassus Saussure, 1890Sphex mandibularis Cresson, 1869Sphex maroccanus Schmid-Egger, 2019Sphex maximiliani Kohl, 1890Sphex melanocnemis Kohl, 1885Sphex melanopus Dahlbom, 1843Sphex melas Gussakovskij, 1930Sphex mendozanus Brèthes, 1909Sphex mimulus R. Turner, 1910Sphex mochii Giordani Soika, 1942Sphex modestus F. Smith, 1856Sphex muticus Kohl, 1885Sphex neavei (Arnold, 1928)Sphex neoumbrosus Jha & Farooqui, 1996Sphex nigrohirtus Kohl, 1895Sphex nitidiventris Spinola, 1851Sphex nudus Fernald, 1903 – Katydid WaspSphex observabilis (R. Turner, 1918)Sphex opacus Dahlbom, 1845Sphex optimus F. Smith, 1856Sphex oxianus Gussakovskij, 1928Sphex paulinierii Guérin-Méneville, 1843Sphex pensylvanicus Linnaeus, 1763 – great black waspSphex permagnus (Willink, 1951)Sphex peruanus Kohl, 1890Sphex praedator F. Smith, 1858Sphex pretiosus Dörfel and Ohl, 2015Sphex prosper Kohl, 1890Sphex pruinosus Germar, 1817Sphex resinipes (Fernald, 1906)Sphex resplendens Kohl, 1885Sphex rex Hensen, 1991Sphex rhodosoma (R. Turner, 1915)Sphex rufinervis Pérez, 1985Sphex rufiscutis (R. Turner, 1918)Sphex rugifer Kohl, 1890Sphex satanas Kohl, 1898Sphex schlaeflei Schmid-Egger, 2019Sphex schoutedeni Kohl, 1913Sphex schrottkyi (Bertoni, 1918)Sphex semifossulatus Van der Vecht, 1973Sphex sericeus (Fabricius, 1804)Sphex servillei Lepeletier de Saint Fargeau, 1845Sphex solomon Hensen, 1991Sphex stadelmanni Kohl, 1895Sphex staudingeri Gribodo, 1894Sphex subhyalinus W. Fox, 1899Sphex subtruncatus Dahlbom, 1843Sphex tanoi Tsuneki, 1974Sphex taschenbergi Magretti, 1884Sphex tepanecus Saussure, 1867Sphex texanus Cresson, 1873Sphex tinctipennis Cameron, 1888Sphex tomentosus Fabricius, 1787Sphex torridus F. Smith, 1873Sphex vestitus F. Smith, 1856Sphex walshae Hensen, 1991Sphex wilsoni Hensen, 1991Sphex zubaidiyacus Augul, 2013

 Fossil Species 

†Sphex bischoffi Zeuner, 1931
†Sphex giganteus Heer, 1867
†Sphex obscurus'' Statz, 1936

References

External links

Great golden digger wasp Sphex ichneumoneus - large format diagnostic photographs, wasp with katydid prey
 Online Identification Guide to eastern North American Sphex

Sphecidae
Apoidea genera
Articles containing video clips
Biological pest control wasps